Karanovac is a village in the municipality of Petrovo, Bosnia and Herzegovina. It was formerly part of the Gračanica municipality.

References

Populated places in Petrovo, Bosnia and Herzegovina
Villages in Republika Srpska